Charles Johnson (died 11 July 1967) was a South African cricketer. He played in seventeen first-class matches for Border from 1906/07 to 1920/21.

See also
 List of Border representative cricketers

References

External links
 

Year of birth missing
1967 deaths
South African cricketers
Border cricketers
Place of birth missing